The National Utility Contractors Association (NUCA) is a trade association representing the underground utility industry in the United States. Founded in 1964, NUCA is the largest trade association for this industry in the country. It represents contractors, suppliers, and manufacturers involved in water, sewer, gas, electric, telecommunications, construction site development and excavation sectors of the industry.

NUCA is headquartered in Fairfax, Virginia, a suburb of Washington, D.C.

History

NUCA was founded and incorporated on April 11, 1964 in the law offices of attorney Joseph M. Stone in Washington, D.C. The original founders of NUCA include Stone, Peter J. Ellis, Pat Marinelli, Antonio Marinelli, D.A. Foster and Laurence Siebel.

A jurisdictional dispute between union contractors and plumbers over utility pipe construction at Andrews AFB led to the association's April 1964 foundation. At the air base, located outside of Washington, D.C., The United Association of Journeymen and Apprentices of the Plumbing, Pipefitting and Sprinkler Fitting Industry of the United States and Canada had notified union members that all outside lines, including storm and sanitary sewer lines, must be handled by their union members. Many utility contractors were also told by other unions they were required to submit their job plans to the United Association for review, and that union would assign the work.

After an unfavorable NLRB hearing over the Andrews AFB dispute, attorney Stone wrote other local D.C. contractors outlining the reasons for an association for utility contractors. Stone had a concern that each contractor was fighting alone these larger legislative and regulatory battles. NUCA's founders believed that all of these factors posed a serious threat to utility contractors, and moved into action to sign articles of incorporation.

During the months that followed organizing documents, a logo, a newsletter (The Pipeline), and news announcements were prepared, all leading to a November 1964 meeting in New York City where the attendees agreed to expand the membership from the founding companies.

Chapters
NUCA has 31 chapters, which comprises presences in 22 out of the 50 states, as well as the District of Columbia. This includes seven chapters in Florida, and two each in the states of Tennessee, Texas, Virginia, and Washington.

List of chapters

NUCA of Arizona
NUCA of Colorado
NUCA of Connecticut
NUCA of DC
NUCA of Florida
NUCA of North Florida
NUCA of Northwest Florida
Suncoast Utility Contractors Association (Tampa)
NUCA of South Florida
NUCA of Southwest Florida
NUCA of Central Florida
NUCA of Hawaii
NUCA of Indiana
NUCA of Iowa
NUCA of Greater Kansas City Region
NUCA of Kentucky
NUCA of Nebraska
NUCA of Las Vegas
NUCA of New Jersey
 NUCA of North Dakota
NUCA of the Carolinas
NUCA of Ohio
NUCA of Pennsylvania
NUCA of Rhode Island/UCARI
 NUCA of East Tennessee
NUCA of Middle Tennessee
NUCA Texas
NUCA of North Texas
NUCA of Virginia
Central & Southwest Virginia Utility Contractors Association
NUCA of Washington
NUCA of Eastern Washington and North Idaho

Initiatives

Clean Water Council

NUCA’s Clean Water Council is a part of NUCA's lobbying effort, established in 1991. Since its founding, the Clean Water Council has been a part of  congressional testimony, hundreds of congressional meetings, letters to Capitol Hill, and published studies. It includes representation from 45 national organizations representing underground construction contractors, design professionals, manufacturers and suppliers, labor unions, and other companies, associations, and individuals. The Clean Water Council advocates for federal legislation and policies that will promote clean water and improve the nation’s infrastructure, with the ultimate goal of assuring safe, clean drinking water for all Americans.

Safety

NUCA's safety program offers individualized technical assistance from full-time Certified Safety Professionals on a full range of safety issues, including how to establish and implement a successful safety program and remain in compliance with Occupational Safety and Health Administration regulations. NUCA's Safety Department represents member interests with OSHA regulations, and works closely with other organizations to ensure the best practices in damage prevention. Additionally, there is an annual Safety Directors Forum that brings safety professionals together for networking, advice on risk management and discussing safety problems.

Workforce Development

NUCA is working to provide the tools and resources for its members to attract and develop new entrants to our infrastructure industry by improving the image of the industry and providing educational opportunities to coming generations of Americans. Over the next several years, NUCA has pledged to work with public and private schools (K through 12), community colleges, trade schools, apprenticeship programs, and continuing adult education programs to develop and distribute utility construction and excavation curriculum for students.

"We Dig America" slogan

NUCA has used their copyrighted "We Dig America" slogan since 1973. It originated at the association's 1971 convention. At that convention, following a rousing patriotic number by singer/dancer Jeanne Steel, humorist Don Rick came out on stage and uttered the famous words, "You guys really dig America!"  The slogan became part of the NUCA logo in the late 1970s, and later became the title of a NUCA Award of Excellence, which is given annually to a nonmember who has made a significant contribution to the industry and/or association.

Publications

NUCA distributes a variety of publications, including Utility Contractor Magazine, NUCA @ Work, the member-only NUCA Business Journal, NUCA Safety News and Clean Water Weekly, the latter of which is the official publication for the Clean Water Council. NUNCA is also a member of the newly formed Infrastructure Protection Coalition (IPC), which formed in 2021 comprising four other contractor associations. The IPC issued a nationwide report and 52 state reports entitled "811 Emergency" concerning a purported $61 billion in economic waste and inefficiency in the utility location sector.

References

External links
 NUCA website
 Clean Water Council website
 NUCA on LinkedIn

Trade associations based in the United States
Public utilities of the United States
Organizations established in 1964
1964 establishments in the United States
Companies based in Fairfax, Virginia
Construction industry of the United States